The Kids' Bridge, dual-named as Koolangka Bridge, is a pedestrian bridge in Perth, Western Australia. 
It crosses Winthrop Avenue in Nedlands, joining the Perth Children's Hospital and the Queen Elizabeth II Medical Centre with Kings Park. 

History
The bridge was proposed in 2012, as part of the Perth Children's Hospital, but deferred to give priority to completion of the hospital.

Construction commenced in January 2021, with the bridge opening on 4 August 2021.

Notes

References

External links

Bridges completed in 2021
Nedlands, Western Australia
Pedestrian bridges in Perth, Western Australia
2021 establishments in Australia